The 2016 Nebraska Cornhuskers football team represented the University of Nebraska–Lincoln in the 2016 NCAA Division I FBS football season. The team was coached by second-year head coach Mike Riley and played their home games at Memorial Stadium in Lincoln, Nebraska. They were members of the West Division of the Big Ten Conference.

Previous season and offseason

In the 2015 Nebraska Cornhuskers football season, the team finished 5–7 in the regular season, their 39–38 win over playoff team Michigan State being the most notable. Though not bowl eligible based on their regular-season record, the Cornhuskers went to the Foster Farms Bowl (as a result of a lack of bowl-eligible teams and their high Academic Progress Rate) and beat UCLA 37–29. The team finished 4th in the Big Ten West division at the end of the season.

On July 23, 2016, senior punter and returning starter Sam Foltz was killed in a single-car crash in Waukesha County, Wisconsin following serving as staff for a training camp for high school kickers and punters. Former Michigan State punter Mike Sadler was also killed; LSU kicker Colby Delahoussaye was also in the accident but sustained only non-life-threatening injuries.

Transfers

Outgoing

Incoming

*Player is not eligible to play in 2016 season due to transfer regulations
**Son of Nebraska WR coach Keith Williams

†Walk-on transfer

Coaching departures

2016 recruiting class

Position key

Nebraska Football 2016 Recruiting Class

Walk-on recruits

National signing day was on Wednesday, February 3, 2016.

Tryout walk-ons

Returning starters

Offense

Defense

Special teams

Spring practice

Sources:

72,992 fans attended the Nebraska spring game, continuing the streak of 60,000+ in attendance for Nebraska spring games since 2008. Unlike previous spring games, the teams did not trade the ball but Team Red was the offense and Team White was the defense for the entire game. Additionally, the scrimmage used a unique scoring system that allowed the defense (White) to score and rewarded plays that would otherwise be non-scoring in a normal football game. At the end of the game, Kyle Kasun intercepted the ball as the time expired, allowing the white team to win. The final score was White 46–41. Tommy Armstrong Jr., Ryker Fyfe and Patrick O'Brien all played at quarterback for team Red.

Schedule
Nebraska announced its 2016 football schedule on July 11, 2013. The 2016 schedule consists of 7 home and 5 away games in the regular season. The Cornhuskers will host Big Ten opponents Illinois, Maryland, Minnesota, and Purdue, and will travel to Indiana, Iowa, Northwestern, Ohio State, and Wisconsin.

The team hosted all three of the non–conference games which are against the Fresno State Bulldogs and the Wyoming Cowboys both from the Mountain West Conference, and the Oregon Ducks from the Pac-12 Conference (Pac-12). This was Nebraska's 7th game against Oregon, and head coach Mike Riley's 13th overall game against Oregon, as he previously coached for Oregon rival Oregon State.

Roster and coaching staff

Depth chart

Game summaries

Fresno State

Sources:*Sources:

Nebraska opened the 2016 season with a non-conference matchup against Fresno State at Memorial Stadium. The game marked the start of the second season for head coach Mike Riley. The game marked the completion of a three-game series with Fresno State. The Huskers defeated Fresno State in Lincoln 42–29 in 2011 before winning on the road in Fresno 55–19 in 2014.  These three games are the only meetings between the Huskers and Bulldogs in program history.  Before the game, there was a tribute to the late Nebraska punter Sam Foltz, who was killed in a car crash in July.  Before their first punt, the Huskers observed a moment of silence for Foltz by sending only 10 players onto the field with no punter waiting for the snap. A delay of game penalty was called on the Huskers, which the Bulldogs declined.

Fresno State Game starters

Wyoming

Sources:*Sources:

The 2016 edition of the Nebraska–Wyoming series marked the 8th meeting between the two neighboring state programs. Nebraska entered the game with a perfect 7–0 all-time record against the Wyoming Cowboys. Senior quarterback Tommy Armstrong Jr. threw three touchdown passes during this matchup, in which he set the record for most career touchdown passes in the Nebraska program history, surpassing Taylor Martinez's previous record of 56. The Cornhuskers defeated the Cowboys 52–17 in front of a crowd of 89,895, the stadium's 349th consecutive sellout.

Wyoming Game starters

Oregon

Sources:*Sources:

Nebraska and Oregon played for the 7th time between the two programs on September 17, 2016, at Memorial Stadium in Lincoln, Nebraska. The Ducks went for the two point conversion after every touchdown, only succeeding once, early in the game. Nebraska went on to win the game 35–32, giving Oregon their first loss of the season, and Nebraska their third win to improve their record to 3–0. Nebraska had 428 total offensive yards the whole game, and the Ducks had 482. The Cornhuskers will travel to Eugene, Oregon in the 2017 season to face the Ducks at Autzen Stadium, game 2 of the home-and-home series between the two programs.

Oregon Game starters

Northwestern

Sources:

Nebraska opened conference play with their first road game of the season in Evanston, Illinois against Northwestern. The Cornhuskers won the contest by a score of 24–13. Early in the game, I-back Terrell Newby fumbled the ball at the sideline near the end zone, resulting in a touchback, giving Northwestern the ball. In the second quarter, Northwestern quarterback Clayton Thorson ran the ball 42 yards for a touchdown. Thorson also had a 24-yard touchdown pass to Austin Carr in the 3rd quarter. Nebraska will play the Wildcats at home in 2017 at Memorial Stadium in Lincoln, Nebraska.

Northwestern Game starters

Illinois

Sources:

Nebraska played its second conference game at home against the Illinois Fighting Illini on October 1, 2016. Nebraska beat the Illini by a score of 31–16, claiming their 5th win on the season to make the Cornhuskers 5–0. 

Illinois Game starters

Indiana

Sources:

Indiana Game starters

Purdue

Sources:

Purdue Game starters

Wisconsin

Sources:

Nebraska played the Wisconsin Badgers on October 29, 2016, at Camp Randall Stadium in Madison, Wisconsin. The Cornhuskers entered the game ranked at #7 in the AP Poll, while Wisconsin sat not far behind at #11. The game was the 11th game in the series, Wisconsin winning the previous matchup, 23–21 in Lincoln on October 10, 2015. Wisconsin won the game 23–17 in overtime. Wisconsin scored first in overtime, but missed the extra point attempt. Nebraska failed to score after, allowing Wisconsin to win the game. The all-time series record is now 7–4 in Wisconsin's favor.

Wisconsin Game starters

Ohio State

Sources:

Ohio state Game starters

Minnesota

Sources:

Minnesota Game starters

Maryland

Sources:

Nebraska went undefeated at home for the first time in 4 years thanks to their win over Maryland.

Maryland Game starters

Iowa

Sources:

Iowa Game starters

Music City Bowl

Sources:

Tennessee Game starters

Big Ten awards

Player of the Week Honors

All-Conference Awards

2016 Big Ten All-Conference Honors

National awards

All-America Teams

Team awards
2016 Nebraska Football Team Awards

NFL Draft
 Nathan Gerry (S, 5th Round, 184th pick, Philadelphia Eagles)

Rankings

References

Nebraska
Nebraska Cornhuskers football seasons
Nebraska Cornhuskers football